The 2014 Women's Hockey Champions Challenge I was the 8th and last edition of the field hockey championship for women. It was held from 27 April to 4 May 2014 in Glasgow, Scotland. The tournament doubled as the qualifier to the 2016 Champions Trophy as the winner earned an automatic berth to compete.

The United States won the tournament for the first time after defeating Ireland 3–1 in the final, earning an automatic berth at the 2016 Champions Trophy after their absence in the previous fifteen editions. South Africa won the third place match by defeating Spain 1–0.

Qualification
The following eight teams announced by the FIH competed in this tournament.

 (Host nation)
 (Seventh in 2012 Champions Trophy)
 (Second in 2012 Champions Challenge I)
 (Third in 2012 Champions Challenge I)
 (Fifth in 2012 Champions Challenge I)
 (Sixth in 2012 Champions Challenge I)
 (Seventh in 2012 Champions Challenge I)
 (Highest ranked team not qualified for the next Champions Trophy or Champions Challenge I)

Results
All times are British Summer Time (UTC+01:00)

First round

Pool A

Pool B

Second round

Quarterfinals

Fifth to eighth place classification

Crossover

Seventh and eighth place

Fifth and sixth place

First to fourth place classification

Semi-finals

Third and fourth place

Final

Awards
The following awards were presented at the conclusion of the tournament:

Statistics

Final ranking

Goalscorers

References

External links
Official website

2014
2014 in women's field hockey
Hockey
International women's field hockey competitions hosted by Scotland
2010s in Glasgow
hockey